Panchpokhari Thangpal is a rural municipality located in Sindhupalchok District of Bagmati Province of Nepal. The RM is surrounded by Jugal in the East, Helambu in the West, Rasuwa District covers from North and Melamchi and Indrawati falls in South of the RM.

Panchpokhari Thangpal is a rural local level unit which was established according to the restructure of Nepal in 2017. On 10 March 2017 Government of Nepal announced 744 local level units and 9 later, total 753 local level units as per the new constitution of Nepal 2015. Total population of the RM is 20986 individuals according to the 2011 Nepal census. Banskharka, Baruwa, Bhotang, Thangpalkot, Gunsa, Thampaldhap, Bhote Namlang and Langarche the previous local level units (VDCs) were merged to form this new local level unite.

Constituencies
There are 2 Parliamentary constituencies and 4 Provincial constituencies in Sindhupalchowk District. Panchpokhari falls under Parliamentary Constituency (Sindhupalchowk-2) and Provincial Constituency (Sindhupalchowk-2(B)). MP of Sindhupalchowk-2 constituency is Sher Bahadur Tamang (Nepal Communist Party) and MLA of Sindhupalchowk-2(B) is Nima Lama (Nepali Congress Party).

There are 21 voting booths and 15682 voters in the RM.

Demographics
Total population of Panchpokhari RM is 20986 in which 10693 are Male and 10293 are Female. Number of Household is 5007. Most of the population of the RM follows Buddhism (67%) and second most following religion is Hinduism (31%). Tamang Language is the mostly spoken language in the RM and Nepali language is second mostly spoken language. The Largest ethnic caste is Tamang of the RM and Chhetris are second largest ethnic caste. Education percentage in the RM is low, only 46.03% of people are educated.

References

External links
 Official website

Populated places in Sindhupalchowk District
Rural municipalities in Sindhupalchowk District
Rural municipalities of Nepal established in 2017